Line Sigvardsen Jensen (born 23 August 1991) is a Danish professional footballer who plays as a midfielder for the Fortuna Hjørring in the 3F-Ligaem and for the Danish national team.

Club career
Sigvardsen Jensen, originally a centre back, has played for Fortuna Hjørring since October 2008. She began playing football aged 9 in her native Himmerland. She was signed by NWSL team Washington Spirit in July 2016. In her first season with the team, she played in three matches, two starts, totaling 141 minutes. Sigvardsen Jensen scored her first career NWSL goal on 22 April 2017 giving her team a 1–0 lead over the Orlando Pride.

At the conclusion of the 2017 season, Jensen was waived by the Spirit.

International career
Sigvardsen Jensen captained Denmark to a quarter final place at the 2008 FIFA U-17 Women's World Cup in New Zealand.

A 15–0 win over Georgia in October 2009 was Sigvardsen Jensen's senior international debut. She was called up to be part of the national team for the UEFA Women's Euro 2013.

International goals

Honours

Club
Fortuna Hjørring
Winner
 Elitedivisionen: 2009–10

Runner-up
 Elitedivisionen: 2011–12, 2012–13
 Danish Women's Cup: 2012–13

References

External links
 
 Profile at soccerdonna.de
 Profile at fussballtransfers.com
 Danish Football Union (DBU) statistics

1991 births
Living people
Danish women's footballers
Denmark women's international footballers
Fortuna Hjørring players
Washington Spirit players
National Women's Soccer League players
Danish expatriate women's footballers
Expatriate women's soccer players in the United States
Women's association football midfielders
Danish expatriate sportspeople in the United States
People from Vesthimmerland Municipality
Sportspeople from the North Jutland Region
UEFA Women's Euro 2017 players